The British Fantasy Awards (BFA) are awarded annually by the British Fantasy Society (BFS), first in 1976.  Prior to that they were known as The August Derleth Fantasy Awards (see August Derleth Award).  First awarded in 1972 (to The Knight of Swords by Michael Moorcock) only for novels, the number of award categories increased and in 1976 the BFS renamed them collectively to the British Fantasy Awards. The current award categories are:
 Best Fantasy Novel (the Robert Holdstock Award)
 Best Horror Novel (the August Derleth Award)
 Best Novella
 Best Short Fiction
 Best Anthology 
 Best Collection
 Magazine/Periodical
 Best Independent Press
 Best Comic/Graphic Novel
 Best Artist
 Film/Television Production
 Best Audio
 Best Non-Fiction
 Best Newcomer (the Sydney J. Bounds Award)
 The Karl Edward Wagner Award for "important contribution to the genre or the Society" is given at the discretion of the BFS committee.

The membership of the BFS vote to determine the shortlists of the awards, the winners being decided by juries.

Conventional Fiction Writing 
1Previously "Best Short Story", before 2008.

2Was originally presented as a single award known as "Best Novel", the August Derleth Fantasy Award, until split in 2012.

Anthology, Collection, Magazine, and Press 
1Provided as "Small Press" until 2015, when that was ended and replace with "Independent"

Multimedia 
1Was initially conferred 1973-1980 as "Best Comic"; it was revived in 2009 as "Best Comic / Graphic Novel".

2Awarded only to films from 1973 to 1990, this honor was renewed 2009–2011, (though split into two separate categories), and again starting in 2014 as "Best Film / Television Episode", and then "Best Film / Television Production" from 2016 onward. In the two years 2012–2013, the BFS decided to present for extraordinary contributions to screenplay literature to Woody Allen for Midnight in Paris (2012) and co-writers Drew Goddard and Joss Whedon for Cabin in the Woods (2013).

Nominees and winners (other awards)

Award controversy of 2011
In 2011, British writer Sam Stone won the British Fantasy Award but returned it three days later after editor and anthologist Stephen Jones posted a blog entry pointing out that three of the winning entries (and many of the shortlisted works) were published by Telos Publishing, a company owned by David Howe. At the time, Howe was also chair of the British Fantasy Society, British Fantasy Award coordinator, and partner of Stone.

References

External links
British Fantasy Society Awards
Excerpts and synopses of BFA Award winning and nominated novels

Fantasy
Awards established in 1971
Novella awards
Speculative fiction award-winning novellas
1971 establishments in the United Kingdom
Anthology awards
Short story collection awards